The Mozambique women's national football team is the national women's football team of Mozambique and is overseen by the Mozambican Football Federation.

History

Results and fixtures

The following is a list of match results in the last 12 months, as well as any future matches that have been scheduled.

Legend

2022

Coaching staff

Current coaching staff

Manager history
Felizarda Lemos(20??-2022)
Luís Victor Fumo(2022–present)

Players

Current squad
The following players were named on 26 August 2022 for the 2022 COSAFA Women's Championship tournament
 Caps and goals accurate up to and including 17 December 2021.

Recent call-ups
The following players have been called up to a Mozambique  squad in the past 12 months.

Previous squads
COSAFA Women's Championship
 2022 COSAFA Women's Championship squad

Records

 Active players in bold, statistics correct as of 2020.

Most capped players

Top goalscorers

Competitive record

FIFA Women's World Cup

*Draws include knockout matches decided on penalty kicks.

Olympic Games

Africa Women Cup of Nations

African Games

COSAFA Women's Championship

*Draws include knockout matches decided on penalty kicks.

See also
Sport in Mozambique
Football in Mozambique
Women's football in Mozambique
Mozambique women's national under-20 football team
Mozambique women's national under-17 football team
Mozambique men's national football team

References

External links
Official website
FIFA profile

 
African women's national association football teams